The George Stoppel Farmstead is a pioneer farm located just outside the western city limits of Rochester, Minnesota, United States. The farmstead is owned and operated by the History Center of Olmsted County.  It was listed on the National Register of Historic Places in 1975.  It was nominated for being one of the few surviving mid-19th-century farmsteads in the urbanizing Rochester in the Rochester metropolitan area, with an architecturally distinctive farmhouse and shed.

References

External links

 George Stoppel Farmstead

1861 establishments in Minnesota
Buildings and structures in Rochester, Minnesota
Farms on the National Register of Historic Places in Minnesota
Historic districts on the National Register of Historic Places in Minnesota
Houses completed in 1861
Houses in Olmsted County, Minnesota
National Register of Historic Places in Olmsted County, Minnesota